A list of films produced in Brazil in 1949:

See also
 1949 in Brazil

External links
Brazilian films of 1949 at the Internet Movie Database

Brazil
1949
Films